The cervical spinal nerve 3 (C3) is a spinal nerve of the cervical segment.

It originates from the spinal column from above the cervical vertebra 3 (C3).

References

Spinal nerves